An HMO is a health maintenance organization, an organization that provides or arranges managed care.

HMO or hmo may also refer to:

Codes
 IATA code for General Ignacio Pesqueira Garcia International Airport, in Hermosillo, Mexico
 ISO 639 code for Hiri Motu language, an official language of Papua New Guinea

Science
 Hermanus Magnetic Observatory, the former name of SANSA Space Science, South Africa
 Hückel molecular orbital method, a simple method for the determination of electron energies
 Human milk oligosaccharide, a family of structurally diverse unconjugated glycans
 Methyl Orange (HMo), an acid-base indicator

Others 
 Hatsune Miku Orchestra, a cover album arranged by PAw Lab. (vocal by Hatsune Miku, original music by Yellow Magic Orchestra)
 House in multiple occupation, a residential building housing unrelated people